Michael De Marchi (born 30 August 1994) is an Italian footballer who plays as a forward for  club Padova.

Club career
On 3 July 2019, he signed with Cittadella.

On 25 September 2020, he returned to Virtus Verona on loan.

On 8 July 2021, he moved to Pescara. On 31 January 2022, De Marchi was loaned to Südtirol.

On 6 July 2022, De Marchi signed a two-season contract with Padova.

References

1994 births
Living people
Footballers from Verona
Italian footballers
Association football forwards
Serie B players
Serie C players
Serie D players
A.C. Carpi players
A.C. Prato players
Virtus Verona players
Imolese Calcio 1919 players
A.S. Cittadella players
Delfino Pescara 1936 players
F.C. Südtirol players
Calcio Padova players